Union Latino Americana (ULA) was a short-lived Pan American Governing body of Hispanic fraternities created in the early 20th century. The ULA was established in 1932 during a convention of Phi Iota Alpha in the City of New York.

The ULA organized Latin America into 22 zones. Each of the 21 Latin American countries constituted a zone. The 22nd zone was represented by the United States. The ULA was a framework for the implementation of Pan-American ideology. All the zones were bound by the same constitution and internal rules and regulations. On September 30, 1934, Sigma Delta Alpha, a fraternity established on the island of Puerto Rico, joined the Union. It was renamed Phi Sigma Alpha. By 1937, the ULA had several well established and functional zones including:

 ΦΙΑ - Phi Iota Alpha in 
 ΦΚΑ - Phi Kappa Alpha in 
 ΦΣΑ - Phi Sigma Alpha in 
 ΦΤΑ - Phi Tau Alpha in 

In September 1939, the Phi Sigma Alpha zone separated from the ULA and eventually formed the Phi Sigma Alpha Fraternity of Puerto Rico. The ULA dissolved shortly thereafter.

See also 
Defunct Greek Umbrella Organizations

References

Hispanic and Latino organizations
Phi Iota Alpha
Fraternities and sororities in Puerto Rico
Student societies in the United States
Phi Sigma Alpha
International student societies
Defunct fraternities and sororities
Student organizations established in 1932
Greek letter umbrella organizations
Latino fraternities and sororities
1932 establishments in New York City